Geneviève de Brabant is an opéra bouffe, or operetta, by Jacques Offenbach, first performed in Paris in 1859. The plot is based on the medieval legend of Genevieve of Brabant.

For the 1867 version two additional characters, men-at-arms, were added to Act 2 and given a comic duet, in English-speaking countries widely known as the "Gendarmes' Duet" or the "bold gendarmes", from H. B. Farnie's English adaptation. As well as being a popular performance piece, it formed the basis for the U.S. "Marines' Hymn".

Performance history
The two-act French libretto was written by Louis-Adolphe Jaime and Étienne Tréfeu, and the opera was first staged at the Théâtre des Bouffes-Parisiens, Paris, on 19 November 1859.  A new three-act version (in which the "Gendarmes' Duet" first appeared), revised by Hector-Jonathan Crémieux, was first given at the Théâtre des Menus-Plaisirs, Paris, on 26 December 1867. An expanded five-act version was devised for a production at the Théâtre de la Gaîté on 25 February 1875. A Paris revival in 1908 at the Théâtre des Variétés with Geneviève Vix in the title role ran for 58 nights.

Geneviève de Brabant was first performed in Vienna (Die schöne Magellone) and Berlin in 1861 and Brussels and Madrid in 1869. 
 
The New York premiere was on 22 October 1868, and Farnie's version was first seen in London at the Philharmonic Theatre in Islington, produced by and starring Emily Soldene as Drogan, with Selina Dolaro in the title role, on 11 November 1871.  The production ran for a year and a half, and revivals took place over the following decade with Soldene repeating her Drogan.

Roles

Synopsis (1867)

Act 1 
Place: the town of Curaçao in Brabant
Time: Around AD730
At evening in the main square, the burgomaster Van der Prout announces the imminent return from a pilgrimage to the monastery of Mount Poupard of Duke Sifroid’s party. The Duke, married to the beautiful Geneviève of Brabant, has fallen under a curse which prevents them from having any children. To find a cure, a competition is organized and is won by Drogan, a young baker, offering a magic pie. Secretly in love with Geneviève, Drogan asks for his reward to be made the page of Geneviève. Upon his return, the Duke tastes the magic pie, and feels good (Couplets de la poule).

In Geneviève’s apartments, Drogan implores her to allow him to accept him as her page, and confesses that it is he who has been singing beneath her window each night. He leaves as the Duke joins Geneviève, but after an interruption announcing the imminent arrival of Charles Martel, the effects of the pie on the Duke begin, in the form of a terrible bout of indigestion. As the Duke tries to assuage his digestion with a cup of tea, his counsellor Golo and his poet Narcisse arrive to carry out a plot to seize the crown. Golo and Narcisse tell him that Geneviève and Drogan have been witnessed in an embrace: the Duchess and the page must be put to death. But then Charles Martel demands entry to the palace (Boléro), asking Sifroid and his knights to catch the 8.05 train and join his crusade to Palestine. Sifroid condemns Geneviève, then sets off with his soldiers, by the northern railway.

Act 2 

With the help of her servant Brigitte, Geneviève has escaped, along with Drogan, and they find themselves seven months later in a forest. As two men-at-arms approach, they hide. The Gascon and Flemish men-at-arms tell how they have been tasked by Golo to kill a noble lady. Golo and Van der Prout come on the scene and after despatching the men-at-arms to hunt down Geneviève (Golo having put about the story that Sifroid has been killed in the crusades) he calls up the hermit of the ravine.
Drogan appears disguised as the statue of the hermit, and warns the men to abandon their pursuit as Sifroid is at the Château d'Asnières with Charles Martel. Even though he was married many years before, Golo threatens Geneviève with marriage. The statue of the hermit comes to life (Drogan) and sends the men-at-arms packing. Geneviève decides to feign death, Drogan takes a lock of her hair, and rushes off to reach the Duke.

Meanwhile, Charles Martel and Sifroid have ended their trip at the Château d'Asnières, where they make merry. Sifroid is taken with a masked lady, Isoline, who explains how her husband left her. Drogan arrives and announces the death of Geneviève. Sifroid decides to set off again with his retinue back to Curaçao to meet Golo – who, Isoline reveals, is the husband who abandoned her.

Act 3 
Geneviève and Brigitte are still in the forest with only a young hind for company. Drogan returns with four huntsmen, looking for Golo. Passing by on the way back from their 'crusade', Sifroid and Martel are stopped by the men-at-arms, but Geneviève recognises and vouches for her husband’s identity. Van der Prout swaps sides again and tells Sifroid that the treacherous Golo is planning to be crowned at a quarter to three. All continue back to Curaçao.

At the appointed hour Golo claims the crown, but he is denounced by Drogan and Sifroid has his crown restored. Isoline promises to punish her errant husband, and all ends well.

Recordings
These include a radio broadcast from 1956 reissued on INA Mémoire vive conducted by Marcel Cariven featuring Denise Duval, Deva Dassy, Michel Hamel, Jean Giraudeau, Robert Massard and André Balbon, and one from 1970 also conducted by Cariven on Bourg with Annick Simon, Monique Stiot, Bernard Plantey and Jean-Christophe Benoît among the cast.

References
Notes

Sources
Andrew Lamb, "Geneviève de Brabant" in The New Grove Dictionary of Opera, ed. Stanley Sadie (London, 1992)

External links

 
 Libretto of the original two-act version as originally submitted for censorship
 English translation by H.B. Farnie
Listing of cast of London production and 1878 London revival
 Discography, operadis-opera-discography.org.uk

Operas by Jacques Offenbach
French-language operas
Operas
Opéras bouffes
1859 operas
Operas set in Belgium
Operas set in the Caribbean